Labdatriene synthase (EC 4.2.3.99, OsKSL10 (gene)) is an enzyme with systematic name 9α-copalyl-diphosphate diphosphate-lyase ((12E)-9α-labda-8(17),12,14-triene-forming). This enzyme catalyses the following chemical reaction

 9α-copalyl diphosphate  (12E)-9α-labda-8(17),12,14-triene + diphosphate

The enzyme from rice (Oryza sativa) also produces ent-sandaracopimara-8(14),15-diene from ent-copalyl diphosphate.

References

External links 
 

EC 4.2.3